Datuk Abdul Aziz bin Sattar (Jawi: عبدالعزيز بن ستار;‎  8 August 1925 – 6 May 2014) was a Malaysian actor, singer, comedian, and director who is mostly known for his roles in the black and white Malay films of the 1950s and 1960s.

Early life 
Aziz Sattar was born on Bawean island in Pekalongan Village, Gresik Regency, East Java Province, Dutch East Indies (now Indonesia) on 8 August 1925. When he was three years old, his family migrated to Singapore, where he was raised at Pasir Panjang. There, he met and befriended Salleh Kamil and Shariff Dol, who would later go on to extensive movie careers similar to his own. His early education was at the Sekolah Melayu Kota Raja. However, he was unable to continue his education beyond the age of 11 due to the Japanese occupation of Malaya at the time.

By the time Aziz was 10 years old, he displayed talent as a natural comedian and entertainer, performing for local weddings and festivals in his village. In his early 20s, he worked as a lorry driver.

Career 
In 1952, Aziz and his two childhood friends were invited to work at the Malay Film Productions studio. Initially, he worked solely as a crew member. Later on in 1953, he was invited to join the supporting cast of the film Putus Harapan. More film offers continued, and he eventually became a comedian staple of the Malay films of that era, appearing with successful actor P. Ramlee on numerous occasions, most notably in the Bujang Lapok series of films.

Personal life 
Datuk Aziz Sattar married a total of five (5) times. The first two (2) wives were not widely known whilst the other two were publicly known namely the third with Siti Rumina Ahmad and fourth with Dayang Sofiah, both of whom were divorced. On 16 December 2006, he married for the last time with Hashimah Delan in a high-profile affair that was covered extensively by the Malaysian media.

Honours

Honours of Malaysia 
  :
  Commander of the Order of Meritorious Service (PJN) – Datuk (2007)
  Officer of the Order of the Defender of the Realm (KMN) (2003)
  Member of the Order of the Defender of the Realm (AMN) (1990)

Death 
Aziz died on 6 May 2014 at approximately 02:00 am (MYT) in KPJ Kajang Specialist Hospital at age of 88 due to heart disease.  He was buried at the Bandar Tun Hussein Onn Muslim Cemetery in Cheras, Selangor after Zohor prayers.

Filmography

Film

Television series

Television movie

References

External links 
 
 Article on Aziz Sattar's career
 Article on Aziz Sattar's wedding to Hasimah Delan

1925 births
2014 deaths
Indonesian emigrants to Malaysia
Malaysian people of Javanese descent
Malaysian male film actors
Malaysian people of Malay descent
Malaysian Muslims
Singaporean male film actors
Singaporean Muslims
Indonesian emigrants to Singapore
20th-century Malaysian male actors
21st-century Malaysian male actors
20th-century Singaporean male actors
21st-century Singaporean male actors
Naturalised citizens of Malaysia
Malay Film Productions contract players
Pesona Pictures contract players
KRU Studios contract players
Tayangan Unggul contract players
Commanders of the Order of Meritorious Service
Officers of the Order of the Defender of the Realm
Members of the Order of the Defender of the Realm